Erephognathus is a genus of beetles in the family Carabidae, containing the following species:

 Erephognathus coerulescens (Fairmaire, 1903)
 Erephognathus margarithrix Alluaud, 1936

References

Anthiinae (beetle)